A city is a subtype of municipalities in the Canadian province of Ontario. A city can have the municipal status of either a single-tier or lower-tier municipality. Prior to 2003, Ontario had minimum population thresholds of 15,000 and 25,000 for city status. Minimum population thresholds are no longer necessary for a municipality to brand itself as a city.

Ontario has 52 cities, which together had in 2016 a cumulative population of 9,900,179 and average population of 190,388. The most and least populous are Toronto and Dryden, with 2,731,571 and 7,749 residents, respectively. Ontario's newest city is Richmond Hill, whose council voted to change from a town to a city on March 26, 2019. Previous to that, Markham changed from a town to a city on July 1, 2012.

History 
Under the former Municipal Act, 1990, a city was both an urban and a local municipality. Under that act, the Ontario Municipal Board (OMB) could change the status of a village or town, upon its request, to a city if it had a population of 15,000 or more. The OMB could also incorporate a township as a city under the same conditions with the exception that the population requirements was 25,000 or more. In either event, if located within a county, authorization by the Minister of Municipal Affairs was also required.

In the transition to the Municipal Act, 2001, conventional municipal statuses and their associated population threshold requirements were abandoned. On December 31, 2002, every city that:
"existed and formed part of a county, a regional or district municipality or the County of Oxford for municipal purposes" became a lower-tier municipality yet retained its name as a city; and
"existed and did not form part of a county, a regional or district municipality or the County of Oxford for municipal purposes" became a single-tier municipality yet retained its name as a city.

The current legislation also provides lower- and single-tier municipalities with the authority to name themselves as "cities", or other former conventional municipal status types such as "towns", "villages" or "townships", or generically as "municipalities".

List

See also 
List of communities in Ontario
List of municipalities in Ontario
List of towns in Ontario
List of township municipalities in Ontario
List of villages in Ontario

Notes and references

Notes

References

Cities
Ontario